The DCRRC Track Championships is an annual all-comers track meet in the United States that has been held since the early 1990s. It is hosted by the DC Road Runners Club. Although it has offered multiple distances, it historically emphasizes the mile race. From 2012 the meet has offered prize money in an effort to attract more runners.

Over the years the meet has been held at Wakefield High School, Washington-Lee High School, and T.C. Williams High School. While the distances offered in the championships has changed slightly over time, the meet consistently hosts a mile race on the track. Due to this consistent tradition, the meet was recognized and promoted by the RRCA's Bring Back The Mile tour. All runners regardless of their experience are allowed to race and are subsequently divided into heats depending on their seeded times.

Mile winners
Note:
Key:

References

Annual track and field meetings
Running in Washington, D.C.